Jacob Swegheimer (also listed as John Swegheimer, 25 February 1843 - 15 March 1917) was a private in the United States Army who was awarded the Medal of Honor for gallantry during the American Civil War. He was awarded the medal on 14 July 1894 for actions performed on 22 May 1863 during the Battle of Vicksburg.

Personal life 
Swegheimer was born as John Swegheimer in the Kingdom of Württemberg (modern day Baden-Württemberg, Germany) on 25 February 1843. He married Anna Basiger and fathered 9 children, of which one lived until 1979. Swegheimer died on 15 March 1917 in Delaware, Ohio and was buried in Oak Grove Cemetery in the town of Delaware.

Military service 
Swegheimer enlisted in the Army as a private at the age of 19 at Paducah, Kentucky on 1 March 1862. He was assigned to Company I of the 54th Ohio Infantry. On 22 May 1863, during the Siege of Vicksburg, he participated in a volunteer storming charge, an action that earned him the Medal of Honor.

Swegheimer's Medal of Honor citation reads:

Swegheimer was mustered out of service on 27 March 1865 at Goldsboro, North Carolina. His Medal of Honor is accredited to Kentucky.

References 

1843 births
1917 deaths
Military personnel from Baden-Württemberg
German emigrants to the United States
United States Army Medal of Honor recipients
American Civil War recipients of the Medal of Honor
Union Army soldiers
Burials at Oak Grove Cemetery, Delaware, Ohio